Forest Law may refer to:

 Royal forest#Forest law, a system established by William the Conqueror put in service to protect game animals and their forest habitat from destruction
 Forestry law, laws governing activities in designated forest lands with respect to forest management and timber harvesting
 Forest Law (Tekken), a playable character in Namco Bandai's Tekken fighting game franchise